Werauhia cowellii is a plant species in the genus Werauhia. This species is native to Venezuela.

References

cowellii
Flora of Venezuela